Deroplatys gorochovi is a species of praying mantis in the subfamily Deroplatyinae
and the new (2019) family Deroplatyidae.

This "dead leaf mantis" species is native to the tropical forests of southern Vietnam.

See also

References

gorochovi
Deroplatyinae
Mantodea of Southeast Asia

Insects described in 1998